The following highways are numbered 1D:

India

Mexico
 Mexican Federal Highway 1D

United States
 Delaware Route 1D
 Nebraska Spur 1D